There are a number of places named Dekheila
 Akrotiri and Dhekelia
 Dekheila (Egypt) (Alexandria)
 HMS Grebe (Dekheila Airfield)

See also
 Al-Ezz Dekheila Steel Co.